Alcantarea imperialis is a species of bromeliad in the genus Alcantarea. This species is endemic to Brazil.

It was first described in 1888 as Vriesea imperialis by Élie-Abel Carrière, who dedicated it to the emperor of Brazil with the species epithet, imperialis. It was assigned to the genus, Alcantarea,  by Hermann Harms in 1930.

Description
This large terrestrial bromeliad was once classified as Vriesea imperialis but is now recognized as part of the genus Alcantarea.  It can be found growing on rocky slopes in the Serra dos Órgãos in Rio de Janeiro.  It can tolerate dry conditions and full sunlight.  Considered one of the giants of the genus, "its leathery leaves measuring 6 inches in width and 5 feet in length."  It will take up to forty years before producing an imposing red inflorescence that reaches 8 feet, or even ten feet (3 meters)  in height. Its tank will hold up to thirty liters of rainwater.

Cultivars
 Alcantarea 'Ajax'
 Alcantarea 'Black Cinder'
 Alcantarea 'Gladys'
 Alcantarea 'Helenice'
 Alcantarea 'Purple Skotak'
 Alcantarea 'Silver Plum'
 Alcantarea 'Tarawera'
 Alcantarea 'Totara Orange'

References

BSI Cultivar Registry Retrieved 11 October 2009

imperialis
Flora of Brazil
Taxa named by Élie-Abel Carrière